Nelson Taylor Jr. (1854–1912) was a one-term mayor of South Norwalk, Connecticut in 1885. He was a member of the Connecticut Senate from the 13th district until 1888.

He was the son of Nelson Taylor (1821–1894) and Mary Ann Taylor (1823–1908). He was admitted to the bar in 1878. In 1879, he was a State Attorney.

He was mayor of South Norwalk in 1885.
In 1888, he vacated the Connecticut Senate seat.

References 

1854 births
1912 deaths
Burials in Riverside Cemetery (Norwalk, Connecticut)
Connecticut lawyers
Connecticut state senators
Harvard University alumni
Mayors of Norwalk, Connecticut
19th-century American politicians
19th-century American lawyers